Mastaangi (English: Playfulness) is an Indian television series that premiered on Channel V India on 18 January 2016. The show is about a couple whose love story comes to a tragic end with both of them having untimely deaths. They meet again in a new life only to uncover the mystery of their past life and rekindle their love.

Plot 
In 1995 a young couple named Kabir, a RAW agent, and Udita (taken name), an ISI agent, meet mysterious deaths in Pune.

They meet each other 21 years after that incident, certainly through reincarnation and named Karan and Ria. Ria has irregular heartbeat and often has mysterious nightmares about her previous life.They study in St. Stephen's college, Pune. Individually and in many instances when one comes face to face with the other, they recall their past life incidents. Anushka, another RAW agent and partner of Kabir in a mission that year has also taken a rebirth and is named Anaita.Anushka had crush on Kabir.She was involved in their tragic deaths. Anaita, who is now Ria's best friend, studies in the same college. "Operation Tabahi" mastermind ISI Commander Zuber, too, was connected with their past life.

Zuber, under the name Ishaan, lives in Pune as an industrialist just to fulfill that unaccomplished operation. Coincidentally, he is one of the members of board of trustees of St. Stephen's college and his son Yuvraj (given name) studies in that college. Ria's father is a psychiatrist who tries to figure out Ria's disease. Anaita stays in Ria's house in Pune. Karan lives in Pune with his brother and sister-in-law. His brother works in a newspaper agency. During a mask party at college when Euro tries to harass Ria, Karqn starts beating him but stops immediately when Ria refers to him as "Kabir".After the incident,Ria and Anaita become friends with Karan. Su, Vanessa, Jiggs and Trumpet are also their friends. Zuber  plots to restart Mission Tabahi to destroy India.

Anaita gets attracted to Karan and as a result of her obsession, develops hatred towards Ria, whom Karan is attracted to. Anaita feels that Ria is framing herself to be innocent and kind while portraying her as the bad one. The friendship of the two are spoiled not due to any of Ria's doings but Anushka's hatred towards Udita in the past life.

In the end, they all get to know about Zuber's plans. Anaita helps Karan and Ria. Veer Singh helps them to discover their past lives. Anushka killed Kabir and Udita. Eventually, they come together to fight Zuber and Yuvraj is killed. Finally, everyone is saved and Anaita and Veer confess their feelings for each other. Jiggs and Su also unite. Karan and Ria re-unite and lived happily ever after.

Cast
Aakash Talwar as RAW Agent Kabir Kapoor / Karan "K" Malhotra
Swati Kapoor as ISI Agent Udita / Ria Sareen 
Himani Sahani aa RAW Agent Anushka Khanna / Anaita "Anu" Shroff 
Raaj Singh Arora as ISI Commander Zuber Akhtar Khan / Ishaan Rai Singhania 
Ankit Raaj as Veer Singh Shekhawat 
Rutpanna Aishwarya Sethi as Suhani 
Bhumika Gurung as Vanessa
Nitin Bhatia as Jignesh "Jiggs" 
 Nidha Bhat as Trumpet
Pankaj Bhalla as Yuvraj "Euro" Rai Singhania / Yunnus Khan 
Viren Singh Rathore as Ricky Nanda 
Jyoti Gauba as Mrs. Khanna
Tithi Raaj as ISI Agent Sophia
Parveen Kaur as Psychologist

References

External links
 

Channel V India original programming
Indian television series
Indian drama television series
Indian television soap operas
2016 Indian television series debuts
2016 Indian television series endings
Television shows set in Pune
Indian teen drama television series
Espionage television series
Research and Analysis Wing in fiction
India–Pakistan relations in popular culture